Rangimarie Edwards-Bruce (born 7 August 1997) is a New Zealand professional rugby league footballer. She previously played for the Newcastle Knights in the NRL Women's Premiership.

Background
Edwards-Bruce was born in Kaitaia, New Zealand and is of Māori descent.

Playing career

Early years
In 2018, Edwards-Bruce represented the Queensland Country team. In 2019, she was selected as part of the Queensland Female Performance Program squad. In 2021, she played for the North Queensland Gold Stars in the BHP Premiership. In December 2021, she signed with the Newcastle Knights to be a part of their inaugural NRLW squad.

2022
In February, Edwards-Bruce played for the Māori All Stars against the Indigenous All Stars. In round 1 of the delayed 2021 NRL Women's season, she made her NRLW debut for the Knights against the Parramatta Eels. She played in 5 matches for the Knights, before parting ways with the club at the end of the season.

References

External links
Newcastle Knights profile

1997 births
New Zealand female rugby league players
New Zealand Māori rugby league players
Newcastle Knights (NRLW) players
Rugby league second-rows
Living people